FC DISI Invest is a futsal club from Dushanbe, Tajikistan, and plays in Tajikistan Futsal League.

Honours
 Tajikistan Futsal League :
 2015, 2016, 2017, 2018
 Tajikistan Futsal Cup :
 2013, 2015–16, 2016–17

References 

Futsal clubs established in 2013
Futsal in Tajikistan